Ilinčić is a Serbian surname. Notable people with the surname include:

 Roksanda Ilinčić (born 1975), Serbian fashion designer
 Zlatko Ilinčić (born 1968), Serbian chess grandmaster

See also
 Iličić

Serbian surnames